Fright is a 1971 British thriller film starring Susan George, Ian Bannen, Honor Blackman, and John Gregson. The film follows a babysitter who is terrorized one evening by her employer's deranged ex-husband. Its original working titles were The Baby Minder and Girl in the Dark before it was titled Fright.

Plot
College student Amanda is babysitting for Helen and Jim, watching after their young son at their large estate in the woods. When she arrives, the child, Tara, is already asleep; Helen and Jim leave, Amanda makes tea in the kitchen, and is watched by a man through the window. After hearing odd noises, she is startled by the doorbell ringing, and finds her boyfriend Chris at the door. The two lounge on the couch before she makes him leave after Helen calls the home to check in. As Chris walks outside, he is attacked by a man hiding outside who clobbers him on the head.

Amanda continues to hear knocking noises and believes it is Chris playing a prank on her. She opens a window to reveal a silhouetted face staring back at her. Panicked, Amanda calls the restaurant where Helen is dining with her boyfriend Jim and their friend, Dr. Cordell. Helen is notified by the restaurant staff and goes to take the call, but the line goes dead after she picks up. Worried that her ex-husband, Brian, may have arrived at the home, Helen has Jim call the local psychiatric institute, who notify him that Brian escaped earlier in the night; Helen reveals in conversation that he had been institutionalized after he attempted to murder her; Dr. Cordell is his doctor.

At the front door, Amanda finds Chris, covered in blood; with him is Brian, who claims to be a neighbor who heard a commotion outside. Chris loses consciousness on the floor, and Brian consoles Amanda, who is distraught. At the house, Amanda grows disconcerted when Brian refuses to allow her upstairs, and begins calling her Helen. Realizing that he is Helen's ex-husband, Amanda begins to play into Brian's delusions, and repeatedly proclaims her love for him.

Brian eventually falls asleep, and Amanda attempts to leave the house with Tara, but is stopped by him in the foyer. Chris regains consciousness and attempts to fight Brian, but Brian murders him. Amanda flees out the front door just as police arrive at the home, but she is pulled back inside by Brian, who threatens her and Tara with a shard of glass. Helen and Jim arrive at the home, where Dr. Cordell and numerous policemen have gathered. A standoff ensues in which they attempt to coax him out of the house. Brian demands Helen come inside, but she agrees only on the condition that Amanda and Tara are let outside.

Helen enters the home, where Brian locks her inside, and begins choking her after he finds she has brought in a canister of tear gas. Amanda stops him by slashing his face open with the glass shard, and flees outside. Brian charges after her, carrying Tara with a piece of glass against his neck. The police hold fire and Helen follows outside and attempts to negotiate with him. Brian hands Tara to her and she slowly backs away from him. As she does so, Amanda avenges Chris by shooting Brian in the head, killing him.

Cast
Susan George as Amanda
Honor Blackman as Helen Lloyd
Ian Bannen as Brian Lloyd
John Gregson as Dr. Cordell
George Cole as Jim
Tara Collinson as Tara
Dennis Waterman as Chris
Maurice Kaufmann as Inspector 
Michael Brennan as Sergeant
Roger Lloyd-Pack as Constable

Production

Susan George, who had worked with him before in Up the Junction (1968), would work with Collinson a third and final time in Tomorrow Never Comes (1978).

Filming

The film was shot at Shepperton Studios.

Release

Critical response
A review published in The Village Voice noted: "Fright has little else on its mind other than what the title implies, but the first half hour of the film is so full of red herrings and squeaky doors that all the potential for situational horror is soon dissipated." Leonard Maltin deemed the film a "contrived, [with] mechanical direction and so-so script." Roger Ebert praised George and Bannen's performances, but deemed the film "a passably good thriller" in comparison to director Collinson's previous film, The Penthouse (1967).

Robert Sellers of the Radio Times called the film "formulaic" in direction and added: "George merely alternates between pouting and screaming," assessing her performance as a "dress rehearsal for her ordeal in Straw Dogs." Vincent Canby of The New York Times criticized the film's cinematography and "arbitrary cruelties," deeming it a "a describably dreadful English suspense melodrama."

Film historian James Arena credited the film as a "groundbreaker" of the "terrorized babysitter formula," comparing it to Halloween, which was released seven years later. Other critics, such as Gary Smith, cite the film as a proto-slasher film.

The film has been referenced in two episodes of the Minder Podcast.

Home media
Anchor Bay Entertainment released Fright on DVD in 2002. On 3 June 2019, Scream Factory announced they will be releasing a Blu-ray edition of the film on 17 September 2019.
In October 2019, Studio Canal released the movie on Blu-Ray in the UK in a brand new restoration, featuring extra features with interviews with Susan George and horror expert Kim Newman.

References

External links
 
 

1971 films
1971 horror films
1971 independent films
1970s psychological thriller films
1970s slasher films
British independent films
British psychological thriller films
Films directed by Peter Collinson
Films set in country houses
Home invasions in film
Films shot at Shepperton Studios
1970s English-language films
1970s British films